is a railway station located in Minami-ku, Kyoto, Japan, on the JR Kyoto Line operated by JR West. It opened on October 18, 2008. Katsuragawa is between Nishiōji and Mukōmachi Stations, west of the bridges over the Katsura River (Katsuragawa in Japanese).

The station on a four-track section has a single island platform between center two tracks. It serves trains 12 cars long. An overhead bridge provides access to the platform, as well as unrestricted passage from one side of the station to the other. Facilities include elevators, escalators, and multipurpose toilets.

The station serves the nearby Japan Ground Self-Defense Force base at Katsura. Passengers can access Rakusaiguchi Station on the Hankyū Kyoto Main Line, about 600 m distant.

History 
Katsuragawa Station opened on 15 March 2008.

Station numbering was introduced to the station in March 2018 with Katsuragawa being assigned station number JR-A33.

Adjacent stations

Surroundings
Aeon Mall Kyoto Katsuragawa, an Aeon Group shopping mall with 214,000-square-meter floor space is located next to the station and connected to the station with a walk bridge.

References

This article incorporates material translated from 桂川駅 (京都府) (Katsuragawa-eki (Kyoto-fu)) in the Japanese Wikipedia, retrieved on June 21, 2008.

External links

Katsuragawa Station (JR West) 
Kyoto city government official site 

Railway stations in Japan opened in 2008
Railway stations in Kyoto Prefecture
Tōkaidō Main Line